Rezaabad-e Gijan Samedi (also Romanized as Reẕāābād-e Gījān Sāmedī; also known as Reẕāābād-e Gījān) is a village in Radkan Rural District, in the Central District of Chenaran County, Razavi Khorasan Province, Iran. At the 2006 census, its population was 15, in 5 families.

References 

Populated places in Chenaran County